Mose in Your Ear is a live album by American pianist, vocalist and composer Mose Allison recorded at the "In Your Ear" club in Palo Alto, California for the Atlantic label in 1972.

Reception

Allmusic awarded the album 4 stars with its review by Scott Yanow calling it a "near-classic set" and stating "This live session from 1972 features Mose Allison at his best".

Track listing
All compositions by Mose Allison except as indicated
 "Look What You Made Me Do" – 3:28
 "Fool's Paradise" (Jerry Fuller, Mabel Cordle) – 4:56
 "I Don't Worry About a Thing" – 2:41
 "Powerhouse" – 8:41
 "Hey, Good Lookin'" (Hank Williams) – 1:56
 "I Ain't Got Nothin' But the Blues" (Duke Ellington, Don George) – 4:26
 "You Can Count on Me to Do My Part" – 2:33
 "You Are My Sunshine" (Jimmie Davis, Charles Mitchell) – 3:09
 "Don't Forget to Smile" – 2:35
 "The Seventh Son" (Willie Dixon) – 4:22

Personnel 
Mose Allison – piano, vocals
Clyde Flowers – bass 
Eddie Charlton – drums

References 

1972 live albums
Mose Allison live albums
Atlantic Records live albums